Zoom Records was a short-lived record label established in Edinburgh, Scotland.  It was founded and funded by the successful music shop owner Bruce Findlay in the summer of 1977. After the first four single releases it secured a licensing deal with Arista Records. Findlay closed the label in 1980, to dedicate his time to managing one of the most successful bands who began there, Simple Minds.

History
Findlay was a well known man in the British music industry. He organised the first Edinburgh Pop Festival in 1973, which featured among others the Incredible String Band, Can, Planxty, the Chieftains, John Martyn, Kevin Ayers, George Melly and Procol Harum.

Zoom signed many Scottish punk and new wave bands, some of them, later well known and successful, like Simple Minds, who Findlay managed from 1978 to 1990. However, one of the first band signed was the Valves; the second band to sign were PVC2 (who featured Midge Ure). The Skids almost joined the label, but Findlay encouraged them to go to their Dunfermline record shop owner,  Sandy Muir, out of which No Bad Records was formed.

The first single released by Zoom was "Robot Love" (with "For Adolfs Only" as B-side), by the Valves, on 30 August 1977, selling 15,000 copies.

Simple Minds signed shortly after their formation, releasing their debut album, Life in a Day and first two singles "Life in a Day" and "Chelsea Girl". Their first three albums (Life in a Day, Real to Real Cacophony and Empires and Dance) were released by Zoom and licensed to Arista Records.

Findlay now manages Aberfeldy, and has been regular host/contributor to Radio Forth and BBC Radio Scotland.

Bands and releases
Ordered chronologically:
 "Robot Love" - The Valves (30 August 1977)
 "Put You in the Picture" - PVC2 (August 1977)
 "Ain't No Surf in Portobello" - The Valves (December 1977)
 "Stuck with You" - Zones (17 February 1978)
 "Radio-active" - The Cheetahs (1979)
All the below licensed to Arista Records
 "Some Other Guy" - The Questions (1978)
 "Love Is Blind" - Nightshift (1978)
 "Can't Get Over You" - The Questions (1979)
 Life in a Day - Simple Minds (10 March 1979)
 "Chelsea Girl" - Simple Minds (1 June 1979)

Albums:
Life in a Day - Simple Minds
Real to Real Cacophony - Simple Minds
Empires and Dance - Simple Minds

References

External links
 schoolhousemanagement.co.uk...a passion for music Homepage of Bruce Findlay, founder of Zoom
 profile of Findlay at Simple Minds site
 The Cheetahs - Radio-Active

Alternative rock record labels
Punk record labels
New wave record labels
Record labels established in 1977
Record labels disestablished in 1980
Scottish record labels